The singular miner bee (Andrena miranda) is a species of miner bee in the family Andrenidae. It is found in Central America and North America.

References

Further reading

 
 

miranda